Roger Bernardico (28 July 1935 – 27 December 2013) is a Uruguayan footballer. He played in nine matches for the Uruguay national football team from 1956 to 1964. He was also part of Uruguay's squad for the 1957 South American Championship.

References

External links
 
 

1935 births
Living people
Uruguayan footballers
Uruguay international footballers
Place of birth missing (living people)
Association football goalkeepers
C.A. Cerro players
Peñarol players
Club Atlético Independiente footballers
Racing Club de Montevideo players
Uruguayan expatriate footballers
Expatriate footballers in Argentina